Don Winslow of the Coast Guard is a 1943 Universal Pictures Serial film based on the comic strip Don Winslow of the Navy by Frank V. Martinbek.

Plot
After service at Pearl Harbor, Naval Commander Don Winslow, and his friend and junior officer, Lieutenant "Red" Pennington, are assigned to the Coast Guard. There they are ordered to devote their activities to anti-fifth column work on the mainland. Winslow learns that The Scorpion, a fascist sympathizer, is in the pay of the Japanese and is expected to lay the ground work for a Japanese attack on the Pacific coast. Constantly in peril and aided by Mercedes Colby, the daughter of a Navy Admiral, they investigate secret island-bases and battles with submarines and enemy planes…

Cast

Production
Martinbek's comic strip was approved by the US Navy. The strip gained new meaning with the approach of World War II, which would also affect the serial: "Its presentation as a Universal serial in October 1941 – just before the infamous attack on Pearl Harbor in December – was one of the most timely contributions of the serial field."

Chapter titles
 Trapped in the Blazing Sea
 Battling a U-Boat
 The Crash in the Clouds
 The Scorpion Strikes
 A Flaming Target
 Ramming the Submarine
 Bombed in the Ocean Depths
 Blackout Treachery
 The Torpedo Strikes
 Blasted from the Skies
 A Fight to the Death
 The Death Trap
 Capturing the Scorpion
Source:

See also
Don Winslow of the Navy
Don Winslow of the Navy (comic strip)
Don Winslow of the Navy (radio program)

References

External links
 
 

1943 films
Films about the United States Coast Guard
World War II films made in wartime
American black-and-white films
1940s English-language films
Universal Pictures film serials
Films based on comic strips
Films based on American comics
Films directed by Ray Taylor
Films set in the United States
American World War II films
1943 war films
Japan in non-Japanese culture
Films with screenplays by George H. Plympton